The North Staffordshire Railway (NSR) was a British railway company formed in 1845 to promote a number of lines in the Staffordshire Potteries and surrounding areas in Staffordshire, Cheshire, Derbyshire and Shropshire.

The main routes were constructed between 1846 and 1852 and ran from Macclesfield via Stoke to Colwich Junction joining the Trent Valley Railway, with another branch to Norton Bridge, just north of Stafford, and from Crewe to Egginton Junction, west of Derby. Within these main connections with other railway companies, most notably the London and North Western Railway (LNWR), the company operated a network of smaller lines although the total route mileage of the company never exceeded . The majority of the passenger traffic was local although a number of LNWR services from Manchester to London were operated via Stoke. Freight traffic was mostly coal and other minerals but the line also carried the vast majority of china and other pottery goods manufactured in England.

As the NSR was surrounded by other larger railway companies, there were in the 19th century several attempts emanating from other companies or proposals from NSR shareholders to amalgamate with one or more of the other companies that adjoined it.  None of these came to fruition and the NSR remained an independent company up to 1923 when it became part of the London, Midland and Scottish Railway Company.

The main routes of the NSR are still in use today; the routes connecting Stoke-on-Trent with Macclesfield, Crewe, Stafford and Colwich Junction remain in use as important parts of the West Coast Main Line, whilst the Stoke to Derby route also remains in use, however most of the less important lines built by the company have since been closed.

Before the railway
The area of north Staffordshire known today as the City of Stoke-on-Trent was already a thriving industrial area before the arrival of the railways. The establishment of the pottery industry and the development of coal and ironstone mines in the 18th century had provided a need for materials, most noticeably clay, to be brought into the area. A corresponding need also arose for the resulting fragile pottery goods to be taken away from the area. This need had given rise in the mid to late 18th century of the construction of the Trent & Mersey Canal (T&M) and its various branches. Opened in 1777 it was a spectacular success and paid dividends reaching 75% in 1822. By 1845 this had fallen to a still impressive 30% despite the onset of railway development in the northwest England.

It was the Trent & Mersey Canal company that built the first railway in north Staffordshire when in 1776 it was granted powers to build a railway, or plateway, from Caldon Low limestone quarries to the canal basin at Froghall in the Churnet Valley.

Formation of the company
The Railway Mania of 1845 found the Potteries still without a railway, although the surrounding towns of Stafford, Crewe, Derby and Macclesfield were all connected to the fledgling railway system. The Staffordshire Potteries Railway promoted a route from Macclesfield to the Grand Junction Railway mainline at Norton Bridge plus a spur to Crewe.  At the same time the Churnet Valley Railway promoted a line from Macclesfield to Derby with a branch to Stoke. After these two companies applied for the necessary powers to build the lines, Parliament suggested a pause of a year "to afford time for consideration and for maturing some more complete scheme for the accommodation of that important district".

The two companies decided to join forces to make a new approach to Parliament. They also incorporated in the scheme a proposal to join the Trent Valley Railway into the Potteries. To do this they promoted the North Staffordshire or Churnet Valley and Trent Junction Railway.  This prospective company issued its prospectus on 30 April 1845 from offices at 1 Old Palace Yard, Westminster, London.  There was to be a share capital of £2,350,000 (£ in ). in £20 shares (117,500 shares).

The prospectus outlined the NSR's plans for two main lines. The Pottery Line running from a junction with the Manchester & Birmingham railway at Congleton to the Grand Junction Railway at Colwich was promoted, as "giving the most ample accommodation to the towns of Tunstall, Burslem, Newcastle-under-Lyme, Hanley, Stoke, Fenton, Longton and Stone". The Churnet Line was to run from Macclesfield though Leek, Cheadle and Uttoxeter to join the Midland Railway line between Burton-upon-Trent and Derby forming a direct link between Manchester and Derby.

The company was formally incorporated in April 1845 under the shorter name of the North Staffordshire Railway.  As a way of eliminating opposition to the company's Bills in Parliament, and to allow it to promote a line to Liverpool, the company made an agreement to take over the Trent & Mersey Canal Company. This was achieved by T&M shares being swapped for preference shares in the NSR.  These preference shares paid a guaranteed annual dividend of 5% once the entire railway was open.  The total purchase cost of the T&M to the NSR £1,170,000.

On 25 November 1845 the Derby and Crewe Railway was absorbed into the NSR Scheme. This was a line that was being supported by the Grand Junction Railway (GJR) running between Derby and Crewe via Uttoxeter and Stoke. It was to eliminate the opposition of the Grand Junction company to the other NSR proposals that the NSR agreed to absorb the Derby and Crewe. However part of the deal was that the proposed line from Harecastle to Liverpool was abandoned. Despite having arranged to purchase the T&M canal for a considerable sum, to obtain support for the Liverpool extension the NSR agreed to the GJR demand. All that survived of the NSR Liverpool plan was the short branch to Sandbach from Harecastle.

Parliamentary approval and construction
On 26 June 1846, the three NSR acts were passed with the total of £2,900,000 in share capital being shared amongst the three lines, with seven years allowed for the completion of each line. The North Staffordshire Railway (Pottery Line) Act provided for the construction of the line from Macclesfield to Colwich with branches to Norton Bridge, Newcastle, Silverdale and Crewe. Parliamentary approval for building railways was needed to allow for compulsory purchase of the land needed for construction.  This act also vested the Trent & Mersey Canal in the NSR. Allocated capital for this work was £1,500,000. The second act, the North Staffordshire Railway (Harecastle and Sandbach) Act provided for the construction of the line from Harecastle to Sandbach, allocated capital for these works was £200,000. Finally the North Staffordshire Railway (Churnet Valley Line) Act authorised the construction of the line from North Rode to Burton, a branch from Tutbury to Willington Junction near Derby, and the line between Uttoxeter and Stoke;  £1,200,000 of capital was allocated to this.

To start the construction work, there was an official sod-cutting ceremony. This took place in September 1846 The site chosen for the ceremony was a field in Etruria. A roped off enclosure for directors was created and the remainder of the field was reserved for invited guests. A mile-long procession headed by John Lewis Ricardo, Member of Parliament for Stoke-on-Trent and chairman of the NSR Company, formed. On Ricardo's arrival, the crowds broke through the roped off area and Ricardo was pushed and shoved. During the actual cutting he buckled the silver spade and had difficulty removing the sod. Finally, his hat blew away.

Construction work went ahead under the supervision of the consulting engineer, George Parker Bidder. By February 1847 there were 1,318 men and 60 horses working between Macclesfield and Colwich and they had removed  of earth, driven  of tunnel heading and erected  yards of fencing.

On 2 July 1847 the North Staffordshire Railway Act was passed. This act was necessary was because of problems encountered with the construction of the Crewe branch. The opportunity was taken to authorise several other deviations and small branches. It also consolidated the previous acts and importantly, forced the NSR to ensure that all lines were completed by specifying that ordinary dividends were not to exceed 5% until the Churnet Valley and Willington lines had been opened.

Work continued apace and by 3 April 1848 the first freight trains were run. Passenger services started on 17 April 1848 and the first passenger train left the temporary station at Wheildon Road, Stoke, hauled by locomotive No. 1 Dragon, heading for a temporary station at Norton Bridge on the London and North Western Railway (LNWR).  The opening of the line gave the Potteries a railway link with Birmingham and London which made it an instant success with the public. Profits for the first two months were £1,668, "exceeding expectations".

The remaining lines under the original Acts were opened in stages but all were completed and open by the end of 1852 when the Stoke to Newcastle and Newcastle to Knutton sections opened. A few months after the opening of the first line, the imposing permanent station in Winton Square, Stoke was opened on 9 October 1848. Stoke station then became the headquarters of the NSR.

Later lines

Later branches constructed in the nineteenth century included lines from Stoke-on-Trent to Congleton via Smallthorne and Biddulph; Stoke-on-Trent to Leek; Newcastle to Silverdale, Keele and Market Drayton (junction with the Great Western Railway); Alsager to Audley, Leycett and Keele, and Rocester to Ashbourne.

Also opened in the 19th century was the only NSR line to achieve any degree of fame, the Potteries Loop Line from Etruria via Hanley, Cobridge, Burslem, Tunstall, Pitts Hill, Newchapel and Goldenhill to Kidsgrove Liverpool Road. Authorised in stages in 1864–65, it opened to traffic in 1873.  Its fame came from several mentions and a description of a journey on a Burslem to Hanley train in Arnold Bennett's The Old Wives' Tale.

Twentieth century construction included the Waterhouses branch line from Leekbrook Junction to Caldon Low quarries and Waterhouses from where the  narrow gauge Leek and Manifold Valley Light Railway (L&MV) was constructed through the Hamps and Manifold river valleys to Hulme End near Hartington. Although the L&MV was nominally independent the NSR both worked and operated the line.

Finally in 1910, the short Trentham Park branch line was built from Stoke-on-Trent to Trentham Park. It was authorised as part of an alternative line to Newcastle-under-Lyme but construction work beyond Trentham was quickly abandoned owing to rising costs. The same act of parliament also transferred the Cheadle Railway to the NSR. The Cheadle Railway was a small local company constructed with NSR's backing, built at great cost over a period of twelve years. The line was opened from Cresswell to Totmonslow on 7 November 1892 and to Cheadle on 1 January 1901.

A full list of authorisation and opening dates for sections of the NSR is given below.

Macclesfield, Bollington and Marple Railway

The Macclesfield, Bollington and Marple Railway (MB&M) was a joint line which the NSR participated in.  A short line of just under  it was opened with the Manchester, Sheffield and Lincolnshire Railway (MS&L) in 1869 to give the NSR access to Manchester independently of the LNWR. As relationships between the NSR and the LNWR grew better the reason for the line lessened as the MB&M route to Manchester was  longer than the LNWR route. Both passenger and freight traffic was handled by the MS&L (or, as it later became, the Great Central Railway) with the buildings maintained by the NSR.

Running powers with other companies
As a company with only a small route mileage the NSR made extensive use of running powers and in exchange granted running powers to other companies.

The earliest agreements were reached with the LNWR. In 1849 an agreement was reached where LNWR traffic could work over the NSR system but in exchange a certain amount of the LNWR London trains had to be routed via Stoke. These Manchester to London Euston restaurant car expresses were unique in often being hauled by NSR tank engines from Manchester to Stoke-on-Trent where the LNWR express engines took over for the run via Stone, Sandon, Colwich, and the main line to London Euston. The NSR received a payment for every through passenger on these trains and employed a small army of ticket inspectors to examine and clip (with its distinctive 'P' clip) every ticket during the Stoke-on-Trent station stop. The agreement did give the NSR access to destinations such as Llandudno, Manchester, Stafford, Wolverhampton and Buxton. NSR goods trains were able to run to places such as Liverpool and Rugby. The LNWR also used running rights over the Uttoxeter–Ashbourne line to run through coaches from Buxton to London via Nuneaton.

Equally important in terms of traffic but not as extensive in terms of route were the running power agreements with the Midland Railway (MR). For the NSR passenger traffic into Derby and Burton was authorised and good traffic as far afield as Wellingborough. The arrangements with these two companies allowed the NSR to run its longest passenger service, between Derby and Llandudno.

In 1867, an independent local company built the Stafford and Uttoxeter Railway, later incorporated into the Great Northern Railway (GNR).  The GNR built its GNR Derbyshire and Staffordshire Extension from Nottingham and Derby Friargate via Mickleover to Egginton Junction with running powers over the NSR from Etwall, through Uttoxeter, to Bromshall Junction. The GNR granted the NSR running rights to Nottingham, Colwick, Leicester and Peterborough. Apart from excursion trains to Nottingham and goods trains to Colwick, the NSR did not take advantage of these powers.

Although the NSR had joint ownership of the MB&M with the MS&L the NSR did not have running powers over the rest of the MS&L and was content to let the MS&L handle all traffic north of Middlewood. Finally with both the NSR and the Great Western Railway (GWR) expanding into Shropshire running rights were agreed for NSR trains to run to Hodnet and Wellington and in return GWR goods trains could run to Stoke.

Amalgamation proposals and financial strength
There were several proposals made either to the NSR or by it, to merge or lease or sell the company to other railway companies. The first was in 1849 when the LNWR, using its financial strength, made suggestions about a merger. To avoid this the NSR had to agree to the running powers outlined above. A further attempt in 1851 got as far as a parliamentary bill being submitted for amalgamation until the select committee appointed to look at the bill reported against the idea.  The LNWR made a further attempt in 1855 which failed because of concerted opposition by the MR, MS&L and GWR.  Less than twenty years later, in 1870, these four companies all combined to look at taking over the NSR following a decision by the NSR board to sell or lease the company. The four rival companies were unable to agree on who would take what share of the NSR and the proposal floundered.

In 1875, the MS&L proposed an amalgamation which initially found favour with the NSR board and shareholders but eventually fell through when the MS&L finances were investigated and it was found that the MS&L was no stronger financially than the NSR. Only two years later some NSR shareholders proposed a merger with the MR, the board dismissed the proposal with the chairman reminding shareholders that

The NSR had a small mileage and had to collect traffic for the large companies which surrounded it. They made profits from good mileages while the NSR had to do a great deal for comparatively little return.

The quote about little return was accurate. In 1877 the NSR dividend was only 2% compared with the dividend of 6% paid by the LNWR to its shareholders. A year later the dividend fell to its lowest ever point of only 1.625%.  However it recovered and after 1881 never fell below 3%.  In 1891 the NSR paid a 5% dividend for the first time, a level not to be reached again until 1913.

Grouping

Under the Railways Act 1921, the NSR was one of the eight major companies designated to form the North Western, Midland and West Scottish Group. This group became the London, Midland and Scottish Railway (LMS).  The act came into force on 1 January 1923 but along with the Caledonian Railway, the NSR amalgamation into the LMS was delayed until 1 July 1923 due to certain legal requirements not being completed by the due date.

Accidents and incidents
In January 1885, a London and North Western Railway express passenger train collided with a freight train near Stoke-on-Trent. One person was killed.
On 27 December 1864 there was a collision between a London and North Western Railway goods engine and van and a North Staffordshire Railway passenger train at Congleton junction where the Biddulph Valley line joined the Stafford-Manchester line.
On 17 February 1899 there was a collision at Congleton railway station.

Other interests
In common with most other British railway companies, the NSR decided early on that it was advantageous to carry out its own maintenance work in all departments and also to undertake much of its own new construction work. Stoke railway works were opened in 1849, capable of producing carriages, wagons and other equipment.  Construction of locomotives followed later, commencing in 1864.

The T&M owned Rudyard Lake which the NSR made use of as a leisure complex, building a golf course, in 1905, on land adjoining the lake. A further area of interest, again via ownership of the T&M, was the lease on Caldon Low quarries. Associated with the quarry was the  tramway that ran from the quarries to Froghall making the NSR the operator of lines of three different gauges.

Although the NSR principally served the urban areas of the Potteries, it did promote the area for tourism, especially the Churnet Valley which local hoteliers had labelled as "Staffordshire's little Switzerland".  The company issued a 150-page guide called Picturesque Staffordshire to support this promotion and dispel the widespread held idea that the county was dull and bleak In addition to the tourist traffic generated the NSR owned three hotels; the North Stafford in Stoke (opposite Stoke station), the Churnet Valley in Leek and the Hotel Rudyard at Rudyard.

Officers of the company

{| class="wikitable" border="1"
! Name
! Period of tenure
|-
|align="center" colspan="2"|Chairmen
|-
|John Lewis Ricardo
|align="center"|1845–1855
|-
|Thomas Broderick
|align="center"|1855
|-
|John Lewis Ricardo
|align="center"|1855–1862
|-
|Thomas Broderick
|align="center"|1862–1865
|-
|Charles Pearson
|align="center"|1865–1874
|-
|Colin Minton Campbell
|align="center"|1874–1883
|-
|Sir Thomas Salt
|align="center"|1883–1904
|-
|Tonman Mosley (later Lord Anslow)
|align="center"|1904–1923
|-
|align="center" colspan="2"|General managers
|-
|Samuel Bidder
|align="center"|1847–1853
|-
|James Forsyth
|align="center"|1853–1863
|-
|Percy Morris
|align="center"|1863–1876
|-
|Martin Smith
|align="center"|1876–1882
|-
|William Phillipps
|align="center"|1882–1919
|-
|Frederick Arthur Lowry Barnwell
|align="center"|1919–1923
|-
|align="center" colspan="2"|Resident Engineers
|-
|Samuel Bidder
|align="center"|1845–1848
|-
|James Forsyth
|align="center"|1848–1865
|-
|James Johnson
|align="center"|1865–1870
|-
|Thomas Dodds
|align="center"|1870–1874
|-
|align="center" colspan="2"|Locomotive superintendents
|-
|Thomas Angus
|align="center"|1874–1875
|-
|Charles Clare
|align="center"|1875–1882
|-
|Luke Longbottom
|align="center"|1882–1902
|-
|John Adams
|align="center"|1902–1915
|-
|John Hookham
|align="center"|1915–1923
|-
|}

Motive power and rolling stock

Locomotives

NSR motive power came from a mixture of sources. Before the establishment of Stoke works there was a complete reliance on outside contractors. The first locomotives were either purchased from contractors building the line or firms such as Sharp Brothers and Company, B. Hick and Son, Kitson, Thompson and Hewitson, the Vulcan Foundry or Jones and Potts.

Originally the resident engineers were responsible for the locomotive stock and the first four holders of this post were all primarily civil engineers.  In 1863 the new general manager, Morris, commissioned an outside report on the NSR locomotive fleet which recommended the rebuilding of 50 engines.  By the time this report was produced a new engineer, Johnson, had been appointed.  He undertook the improvements but the results were unsatisfactory and Johnson left in 1870 after only five years in post. The only significant event of Johnson's tenure was the building of the first engines at Stoke works when three 0-6-0T engines were built in 1868.  Johnson's successor, Dodds, fared no better as his patented wedge motion, a type of valve gear, was unsuccessful. Dodds was dismissed in 1875 and a new post of locomotive superintendent created with a locomotive engineer, Angus, in charge.  Although only in post for two years Angus replaced all the wedge motions with Stephenson valve gear.

There followed a long period of locomotive construction internally with all locomotives between 1875 and 1900 coming from the company works.  The vast majority of these being tank engines although a small number of tender engines were constructed.  Most engines, whether tank or tender locomotives were built with either 2-4-0 or 0-6-0 wheel arrangements. An urgent need for heavier goods engines prompted the company to go to contractors and a small number of 0-6-0 designs were purchased from Nasmyth, Wilson and Company.  In 1903 five 0-6-2T engines were purchased from Vulcan Foundry and with the exception of two locomotives for shunting purchased from Kerr Stuart in 1919 these were the last engines not to be built by the company at Stoke.

Apart from engine No 1 of 1848 being named Dragon only two other NSR engines were ever named, in 1882 Class C 2-4-0 No. 55 was named Colin Minton Campbell and Class C No. 54 John Bramley Moore after the chairman and deputy chairman of the company, respectively.

The NSR also used a small number of railmotors with three being purchased in 1905 from Beyer, Peacock and Company.  They were used on routes such as the Stoke–Newcastle service but were not a success. The vehicles did survive until grouping but had been taken out of service for some time some years earlier. In addition to the NSR locomotives were the two engines of the Leek & Manifold and the three engines that worked the Caldon Low quarries. The former were purchased from Kitson and Company and the latter from Henry Hughes and W. G. Bagnall.

At grouping 196 steam locomotives including the L&MV and Caldon Low engines were absorbed into the LMS along with the three railmotors and one battery electric locomotive. This last engine was built at Stoke in 1917 for shunting the copper works at Oakamoor. Four engines under construction at Stoke in 1923 were completed and also added to the LMS stock. Although many of the locomotives were not old, due to the LMS policy of standardisation all NSR engines had been withdrawn from service by 1939.  The one exception was the battery electric shunting locomotive which remained in service until 1963.

Two NSR locomotives are preserved. NSR No. 2, an 0-6-2T New L class (one of the four constructed in 1923) and the battery electric locomotive.  Both formed part of the national collection at the National Railway Museum but in 2016 ownership of the New L class locomotive was transferred to the Foxfield Railway where the locomotive is now on display.

Locomotive depots
The largest locomotive depot was at Stoke, with 125 engines at grouping.  The next largest was Alsager with an allocation of 15 engines. Other NSR depots existed at Macclesfield, Derby, Uttoxeter, Burton and Crewe.  Stoke also had sub-sheds at Market Drayton, Leekbrook and Ashbourne.  NSR engines were also sub-shedded at other companies depots, with arrangements existing at the LNWR sheds at Stafford, Liverpool Edge Hill and Manchester Longsight and the GNR shed at Nottingham Colwick.

Locomotive liveries
Up to 1882 locomotives were a bright green with black and white lining with a Staffordshire knot emblem on the tank or tender sides.  Longbottom introduced a new livery of a red brown with black, yellow and vermilion lining.  Longbottom was succeeded by Adams who changed the livery once more to a crimson shade called Madder Lakewith yellow and vermilion lining. The knot emblem was replaced by the company coat of arms and the words North Stafford.

Coaching stock
The NSR coaching stock was, even until grouping, predominantly four and six wheeled vehicles. Four-wheeled carriages were the norm from the start and the last were constructed in the 1880s, although by then they had progressed from the unbraked coaches of the 1840s with the introduction of the communication cord in 1869 and the simple vacuum brake in 1883. The first bogie coaches were introduced in 1906 for use on the Derby–Llandudno service and these were followed by further examples until 1923. By 1919 all carriages, except 13 four-wheelers used on miners' trains, had been fitted with steam heating and a number of vehicles had been fitted with through pipes to allow use in trains equipped with Westinghouse brakes. Most carriages were constructed at Stoke but some were purchased from companies such as the Metropolitan Carriage, Wagon and Finance Company.

One area where the NSR was a pioneer was in the use of electrical lighting being the largest of only three British railway companies to switch from oil to electric lighting and not use any form of gas lighting.  The first coach was fitted in 1897 and new stock constructed from 1899 had electric lighting as standard.  Conversion of the remaining stock was slow and in 1910 there were still some oil-lit carriages in service.

Coaching liveries
Coaching stock was originally claret but in 1875 was changed to Victoria Brown and white (except for branch line trains which carried an all over Victoria Brown livery) with gold and blue lining.  Victoria Brown was the same red brown colour as Longbottom had introduced for NSR locomotives.  In 1882 waist panels were additionally painted white.  This colour scheme lasted until 1896 when it was changed to an overall Victoria Lake (brown) colour with gold and blue lining. Adams changed the livery to Madder Lake in 1903 to match the locomotives, the lining became yellow and red.  A final minor change was to paint the waist panels of first class compartments cream to distinguish them. A constant presence was the company coat of arms being displayed on the coach sides.

Goods stock
Over its life the NSR built or bought many thousands of goods wagons. Early wagons had dumb buffers with spring buffers being introduced from 1870.

The NSR handed over to the LMS 6,612 goods wagons of which over 5,000 were open wagons for the transport of coal and other minerals.  This number was dwarfed by the number of wagons owned by the pits, ironworks, other industrial operations and traders in the Stoke area.  An unusual set of wagons to be seen were the bright yellow with red lettering vans owned by the Barnum and Bailey circus who had their main English depot in Stoke.

Goods liveries
Goods vehicles were painted red oxide with white lettering and a white Staffordshire knot. The letters N.S.R with only two full stops were carried in small letters.  From 1912 the letters were increased in size but changed to just N S with a central knot and no full stops.

The Knotty

The NSR is one of the few railways to become the subject of a play. In 1966, Peter Cheeseman, artistic director of The Victoria Theatre, Stoke wrote a musical documentary about the NSR called The Knotty. Featured in the play were the voices of several NSR staff who had been interviewed especially for the play. The script with introductory notes by Cheeseman was published in 1970. Sound recordings of the production, The Knotty – a musical documentary, was released on LP by Argo Transacord in 1970 and as a digital version in 2014.

NSR main lines and branch lines—opening dates
Dates of authorisation and opening are given in the following table.

{| class="wikitable"
! Section of line
! Date construction authorised
! Passenger service started
! Goods service started
|-
| Stoke-on-Trent – Norton Bridge
| 26 June 1846
| 17 April 1848
| 3 April 1848
|-
| Stoke-on-Trent – Uttoxeter
| 26 June 1846
| 7 August 1848
| 7 August 1848
|-
| Uttoxeter – Burton-on-Trent
| 26 June 1846
| 11 September 1848
| 11 September 1848
|-
| Stoke-on-Trent – Crewe and Congleton
| 26 June 1846
| 9 October 1848
| 9 October 1848
|-
| Stone–Colwich
| 26 June 1846
| 1 May 1849
| 1 May 1849
|-
| Congleton–Macclesfield
| 26 June 1846
| 18 June 1849
| 18 June 1849
|-
| Churnet Valley Line
| 26 June 1846
| 13 July 1849
| 13 July 1849
|-
| Tutbury–Derby
| 26 June 1846
| 13 July 1849
| 13 July 1849
|-
| Harecastle–Sandbach
| 26 June 1846
| 3 July 1893
| 21 January 1852
|-
| Stoke-on-Trent – Newcastle-under-Lyme
| 26 June 1846
| 6 September 1852
| 6 September 1852
|-
| Newcastle-under-Lyme – Knutton
| 2 July 1847
| May 1863
| 6 September 1852
|-
| Knutton–Silverdale
| 13 August 1859
| May 1863
| 1850
|-
| Silverdale – Market Drayton
| 29 July 1864
| 1 February 1870
| 1 February 1870
|-
| Etruria–Shelton
| 2 July 1847
| January 1862
| 1850
|-
| Shelton–Hanley
| 13 August 1859
| 13 July 1864
| 20 December 1861
|-
| Hanley–Burslem
| 5 July 1865
| 1 November 1873
| 1 November 1873
|-
| Burslem–Tunstall
| 5 July 1865
| 1 December 1873
| 1 December 1873
|-
| Tunstall–Goldenhill
| 5 July 1865
| 1 October 1874
| 1 October 1874
|-
| Goldenhill–Kidsgrove
| 5 July 1865
| 15 November 1875
| 15 November 1875
|-
| Rocester–Ashbourne
| 22 July 1848
| 31 May 1852
| 31 May 1852
|-
| Biddulph Valley Line
| 24 July 1854
| 1 June 1864
| 28 August 1860
|-
| Milton Junction - Leek Brook Junction
| 13 July 1863
| 1 November 1867
| 1 November 1867
|-
| Audley Line
| 29 July 1864
| 28 June 1880
| 24 July 1870
|-
| Cresswell–Tean
| 7 August 1888
| 7 November 1892
| 7 November 1892
|-
| Tean–Cheadle
| 7 August 1888
| 1 January 1901
| 1 January 1901
|-
| Waterhouses – Hulme End (L&MVLR)

| 6 March 1899
| 27 June 1904
| 29 June 1904
|-
| Leek Brook – Ipstones

| 6 March 1899
| 5 June 1905
| 5 June 1905
|-
| Ipstones – Waterhouses
| 6 March 1899
| 1 July 1905
| 1 July 1905
|-
| Trentham Park Branch
| 21 August 1907
| 1 April 1910
| 1 April 1910
|-
|}

See also
 Leek and Manifold Valley Light Railway

Notes

Explanatory notes

References

Sources

External links
The North Staffordshire Railway Study Group
Churnet Valley Railway
North Staffordshire Railway Photographs
Historic photographs of the NSR from Stoke-on-Trent Museums Service

 
Companies based in Stoke-on-Trent
Railway companies established in 1845
Railway lines opened in 1848
Railway companies disestablished in 1923
History of Staffordshire
London, Midland and Scottish Railway constituents
Pre-grouping British railway companies
Rail transport in Staffordshire
Rail transport in Stoke-on-Trent
1845 establishments in England
1923 disestablishments in England
British companies established in 1845
British companies disestablished in 1923